These are the official results of the Men's Long Jump event at the 1993 IAAF World Championships in Stuttgart, Germany. There were a total of 45 participating athletes, with two qualifying groups and the final held on Friday August 20, 1993.

Medalists

Records

Final

Qualifying round
Held on Saturday 1993-08-14

See also
 1990 Men's European Championships Long Jump (Split)
 1991 Men's World Championships Long Jump (Tokyo)
 1992 Men's Olympic Long Jump (Barcelona)
 1993 Long Jump Year Ranking
 1994 Men's European Championships Long Jump (Helsinki)
 1995 Men's World Championships Long Jump (Gothenburg)

References
 Results

L
Long jump at the World Athletics Championships